Joseph Tucci (p/k/a Eric Matthew), has been a record label owner, record producer, engineer, songwriter and guitarist, previously involved in the New York post-disco scene of the early 1980s.

Biography 
Joe originally performed at weddings, bar mitzvahs and parties in the New York metropolitan area with his friends, then after producing a demo with fellow bandmember Gary E. Turnier, he landed a record deal with indie label SAM Records, owned by Sam Weiss, which by then had major label Columbia as their distribution company.  Essentially a minimal rock combo with musical influences ranging from deep funk, pop, jazz to disco that consisted of a saxophonist, a trombonist, a flutist, a percussionist, and keyboardists, was named Gary's Gang by Joe. His second album Keep on Dancing  performed well on the music charts, peaking at #27 on the Billboard R&B Albums and #42 on the Billboard 200. This accomplishment led Joe to open his own record label and produce other artists. Among those he produced were "Reach Up" by Toney Lee (on his own label) or the album Redd Hott by Sharon Redd (for Prelude Records).

Joe is married and has three daughters. Musically his influences include 1960s pop and the "zaniness of the later Beatles albums." He produced records like Tracy Weber's "Sure Shot," Sinnamon's "Thanks to You," and Dr. Jekyll & Mr. Hyde's "Genius Rap" in his garage.

Production and writing discography

References

External links 
 AllMusic Page

1953 births
American male composers
20th-century American composers
Record producers from New York (state)
American audio engineers
American rock guitarists
American male guitarists
American soft rock musicians
Post-disco musicians
People from Queens, New York
American people of Italian descent
Living people
20th-century American guitarists
Engineers from New York City
20th-century American male musicians